Dindigul is a Lok Sabha (Parliament of India) constituency in Tamil Nadu. Its Tamil Nadu Parliamentary Constituency number is 22 of 39.

Assembly segments

2009-present

Before 2009
Tirumanagalam (moved to Virudhunagar constituency after 2009)
Usilampatti (moved to Theni constituency after 2009)
Nilakottai (SC)
Sholavandan (moved to Theni constituency after 2009)
Dindigul
Athoor

Members of the Parliament

Election results

General Election 2019

General Election 2014

General Election 2009

General Election 2004

Bye-election 1973

See also
 Dindigul
 List of Constituencies of the Lok Sabha

References

External links
Dindigul lok sabha constituency election 2019 date and schedule

Lok Sabha constituencies in Tamil Nadu
Dindigul district